The Pop's Props Cloudster is a single seat, open-cockpit, parasol wing, single-engine monoplane, that was first flown in 1995. The aircraft was produced by Pop's Props of Cooksville, Illinois and made available as plans or in kit form. The company is no longer in business and kit production has been transferred to Simplex Aeroplanes of Old Saybrook, Connecticut.

The aircraft was designed for the FAR 103 Ultralight Vehicles category, including the category's  empty weight limit.

Design and development
The aircraft was designed for safe low and slow flying from unimproved surfaces.

The Cloudster is constructed of wood and covered in aircraft fabric. The landing gear is conventional with sprung main gear and a tailwheel. The wing is strut-braced with two parallel main struts and jury struts per side.

Due to the laborious wood and fabric construction, builder completion time is estimated at 400 man-hours from the kit. The kit can be ordered as one kit or as several sub-kits.

The Cloudster was later developed into the Zing.

Variants
Pop's Props Cloudster
Original version with  wingspan and  stall speed.
Simplex Cloudster
Improved version with  wingspan and  stall speed introduced in February 2011. The wing was shortened to reduced adverse yaw effects.

Specifications (Pop's Props Cloudster)

See also

References

External links

1990s United States ultralight aircraft
Homebuilt aircraft
Cloudster
High-wing aircraft
Single-engined tractor aircraft
Aircraft first flown in 1995